Mario Steiner (born 12 December 1982) is an Austrian football midfielder currently playing for SV Afritz.

Honours
 Austrian Cup winner: 2000-01
 Austrian Supercup winner: 2001
 Austrian Football First League winner: 2000-01
 Austrian Regional League Central winner: 2011-12

External links
 

1982 births
Living people
Austrian footballers
BSV Bad Bleiberg players
FC Kärnten players
Grazer AK players
FC Waidhofen/Ybbs players
SV Spittal players
FC Gratkorn players
Association football midfielders